Lewis Edgar Wehmeyer (January 1, 1897, Quincy, Illinois – September 11, 1971, Ann Arbor, Michigan) was an American botanist and mycologist. He gained an international reputation as an expert on the genera Pleospora and Pyrenophora.

Biography
After graduating in 1914 from Quincy High School, Lewis E. Wehmeyer matriculated in 1916 at the University of Michigan. His academic education was delayed by a year spent in the U.S. Army Corps of Engineers during WW I. At the University of Michigan he graduated with a B.S. in forestry in 1921 and then matriculated in the department of botany. He held the Emmac J. Cole Fellowship for three years and graduated in 1925 with a Ph.D. His thesis Biologic and phylogenetic study of the stromatic Sphaeriales was supervised by Calvin Henry Kauffman (1869–1931) As a postdoc Wehmeyer held a National Research Council Fellowship at Harvard University for three years.  As a postdoc he collected fungi in Nova Scotia and in September 1927 in Truro, Nova Scotia married Florence Elaine Prince (called Elaine Prince). She was born in Truro on 22 March 1903.

At the University of Michigan, Wehmeyer was an instructor from 1928 to 1931, an assistant professor from 1931 to 1937, an associate professor from 1937 to 1947, and a full professor from 1947 to 1968, when he retired as professor emeritus. He collected many specimens of Pleospora in Wyoming. He was a consultant for mycological specialists in Argentina, Sweden, England, and Canada. His most important work is perhaps his 4th book A world monograph of the genus Pleospora and its segregates, based upon his collection of about 1,200 specimens, of which about 400 are type specimens.

He was elected in 1931 a Fellow of the American Association for the Advancement of Science.

In 1981, a bequest was made in the name of Lewis E. Wehmeyer and Elaine Prince Wehmeyer (1903-1979) for an endowment of a professorial chair in mycology at the University of Michigan. The genus Wehmeyera is named in his honor.

Selected publications

Books and monographs
 
 
 
 
 
 
 
  (Pyrenomycete is a synonym for sordariomycete, defined as any fungus belonging to the class Sordariomycetes.)

See also
 Sarcodon stereosarcinon

References

1897 births
1971 deaths
American mycologists
University of Michigan alumni
University of Michigan faculty
Fellows of the American Association for the Advancement of Science